Áñez is a Spanish surname. Notable people with the surname include:

Alexi Áñez (born 1990), Bolivian female footballer 
Carlos Áñez (born 1995), Bolivian footballer 
Jeanine Áñez (born 1967), Bolivian politician and lawyer
Óscar Áñez (born 1990), Bolivian footballer 

Spanish-language surnames